Mike Cohen is an American television soap opera script writer.

Positions held
Days of Our Lives
 Script Writer: 1987 - 1991, December 22, 2006 - January 16, 2008

Guiding Light
 Script Writer: June 16, 2005 - July 20, 2006

One Life to Live
 Script Writer: 1994 - 1996

Port Charles
 Script Writer: 2001 - 2003

Sunset Beach
 Script Writer: 1998 - 1999

The Young and the Restless
 Script Writer: March 2009-April 23, 2009

Awards and nominations
Daytime Emmy Award
Win, 2007, Best Writing, Guiding Light
Nomination, 1996, Best Writing, One Life to Live
Nomination, 1995, Best Writing, One Life to Live

Writers Guild of America Award
Nomination, 2006, Best Writing, Guiding Light
Nomination, 1994, Best Writing, One Life to Live
Nomination, 1991, Best Writing, Days of our Lives

External links

American soap opera writers
Living people
American male television writers
Place of birth missing (living people)
Year of birth missing (living people)